Olivia Fox Cabane (born in Paris, France) is an autistic American author, public speaker, and the co-founder of Kindearth.Tech. She is the former Director of Innovative Leadership for Stanford University's student accelerator, StartX.  She grew up in Paris, with a French father (physicist Bernard Cabane) and attended French schools, eventually earning three separate master's degrees in law from the Pantheon-Sorbonne University. She is the author of The Charisma Myth and the co-author of The Net And The Butterfly, two books on charisma and the neuroscience of innovation, respectively.

Life and career

Cabane was born in Paris, France, to French physicist Bernard Cabane and American psychotherapist Celie Fox. She subsequently earned two law degrees in international and European business law from the Pantheon-Sorbonne University. and one in German business law from the Ludwig Maximilian University of Munich. She also cites her experiences growing up “socially inept” as forcing her to develop an interest in charisma out of necessity. After spending a year in Peru doing volunteer work, Fox Cabane moved to New York City in 2002, and later relocated with her husband to a mini urban farm in Silicon Valley, where most of her clients reside.

Cabane divides her professional time between keynote speaking to Fortune 500 companies. She works pro bono for non-profit organizations. Her general topics include charisma, leadership, dealing with difficult people, self-confidence and self-esteem. Outside of writing and consulting, Cabane has worked with several universities to teach courses or direct programs. Her course at the University of California's Haas School of Business, where she led a series of workshops which cover techniques she originally developed for Harvard University and the Massachusetts Institute of Technology, was so popular that university staff had to guard the classroom entrance to make sure only students admitted to that course could have a seat. From 2013 to 2015, she was the Director of Innovative Leadership at StartX, a startup accelerator at Stanford University.

Cabane has been featured and quoted in The Wall Street Journal, the New York Times, and the BBC. She has written for Forbes and The Huffington Post. She has been on the Board of Editors of one of the National Law Journal publications, and her education includes three master's degrees in business law from the Universities of Paris and Munich. She is fluent in four languages and is, as of 2018, the youngest person ever to have been appointed foreign trade advisor to the French Government since the role was created in 1898.

Along with Ira Van Eelen, daughter of clean meat inventor Willem van Eelen, she founded KindEarth.Tech (KET), a foundation focusing on accelerating the global shift to a sustainable food system. She is known in the food world for her industry landscapes (newprotein.org) showcasing the rapid development of the alternative protein and dairy industries.

Publications
Cabane's first book, The Charisma Myth, was published by Penguin/Random House in 2012. In this book, the model of charisma she proposes is described as the combination of three elements: presence, power and warmth. Cabane draws influences and methods from cognitive behavioral therapy.

In 2017, Cabane co-wrote a book on increasing innovation in entrepreneurs with Judah Pollack, another consultant for prominent organizations. This book continues her models of cultivating skills – this time, leadership – paired with exercises to develop those skills.

The Charisma Myth, Penguin, 2012
The Net And The Butterfly, Penguin, 2017

References

Further reading
Stanford Technology Ventures Program E-corner Lecture: Build Your Personal Charisma
The Telegraph
Psychology Today
The Wall Street Journal
NY Daily News
Charisma myth, how anyone can master, New York Journal of Books

1979 births
Living people
American columnists
American self-help writers
American motivational writers
Popular psychology
American women columnists
American women non-fiction writers
Women motivational writers
21st-century American women